Line 5 of the Chengdu Metro is a rapid transit line in Chengdu. It starts at Huagui Road and ends at Huilong.

Line 5's color is purple. This line began construction on 14 September 2015, was opened on 27 December 2019, from Huagui Road to Huilong.

Originally, the line was planned to use 6-car Type A rolling stock. However, anticipating high demand as the line will provide relief for the older Line 1 and connect several important business and residential areas, the line was redesigned to allow for expansion to use 8-car Type A rolling stock. This will allow for an ultimate configuration of the line to reach capacities of 64,300 people per hour per direction.

Progress 
 2015
 July 6, Phase 1 & 2 are officially approved.
 In August, all stations started construction.
2016
 November 3, first tunnel section is finished.
 November 4, to accommodate the projected high demand, Line 5 was redesigned from supporting 6-car A-Type trains to 8-car A-Type trains.
 November 12,  topped out, being the first station on the line to do so.
 2017
 December 5, Phase 1 & 2 begins track-laying.
 2018
 April 17, first trainbody was completed by CRRC Chengdu. It is the first A-type train for Chengdu Metro.
 September 9, tunnel construction is finished.
 November 10, first train for Dafeng Depot arrived.
 November 22, elevated sections finished sound barrier work.
 December 15, Elevated sections and Dafeng Depot finished testing.
 December 28, Phase 1 & 2 finished track-laying.
2019
October 30, 41 stations are fully functional and finished station testing; all stations are now operating by Chengdu Metro Company.
 November 22, all escalators passed government assessment.
 December 9, Phase 1 & 2 passed safety assessment.
 December 25, Chengdu Metro officially announced Line 5's opening date scheduled for December 27 is the opening time.
 December 27, Phase 1 & 2 started public operation.
 2020
 August 8, Line 5 trains will have different air conditioning settings in each car. Riders can choose between the center four cars which are set to 27 degrees or the two cars on each end which are set to 25 degrees.

Timeline

Stations

See also

 Chengdu Metro
 Urban rail transit in China
 Line 6, Chengdu Metro

References

Chengdu Metro lines
Railway lines opened in 2019